Sylvia Tanya Brunlehner is a swimmer who has represented Kenya at several international competitions.

She has represented Kenya in the following events:

 FINA World Championships: Roma 2009 (LC), Dubai 2010 (SC), Shanghai 2011 (LC), Istanbul 2012 (SC), Barcelona 2013 (LC), Windsor 2016 (SC)
 Commonwealth Games: Delhi 2010, Glasgow 2014, Gold Coast 2018
 Youth Commonwealth Games: Pune 2008 (LC)
 Youth Olympic Games: Singapore 2010 (LC)
 All-African Games: Algeria 2007 (LC), Mozambique 2011 (LC)Rabat 2019 (LC)
 African Championships: South Africa 2008 (LC), Morocco 2010 (LC)
 Africans Junior Championships: Mauritius 2010 (LC)
 African Youth Games: Morocco 2010 (LC)
 ITU Triathlon: Mauritius 2005, Zimbabwe 2010

References

External links

Sylvia Brunlehner on Eurosport Australia

Living people
1994 births
Kenyan female swimmers
Commonwealth Games competitors for Kenya
Swimmers at the 2010 Commonwealth Games
Swimmers at the 2014 Commonwealth Games
Swimmers at the 2018 Commonwealth Games
African Games bronze medalists for Kenya
Swimmers at the 2015 African Games
Swimmers at the 2019 African Games
African Games medalists in swimming
20th-century Kenyan women
21st-century Kenyan women